Paul Hand (born 3 July 1965) is a British sports broadcaster and former professional tennis player.

Biography

Tennis career
Born in Berkshire, Hand played on the professional tour primarily as a doubles specialist, with a best ranking of 171 in the world. As a singles player he was joint winner of the Scottish Championships in 1992.

Hand regularly featured as a doubles player at the Wimbledon Championships in the 1990s. Most notably he made the quarter-finals of the men's doubles at the 1993 Wimbledon Championships as a wildcard pairing with Chris Wilkinson. They had a win en route over the ninth seeded Jensen brothers, Luke and Murphy, then in the quarter-finals were beaten in five sets, by Rikard Bergh and Byron Talbot. In addition to his six main draw appearances in men's doubles at Wimbledon he played in the mixed doubles four times, all with Valda Lake. He also played in mixed doubles qualifying with his younger sister Kaye Hand.

Post tennis
He now works as a tennis coach and a sports broadcaster for the BBC and Eurosport.

References

External links
 
 

1965 births
Living people
British male tennis players
English male tennis players
English sports broadcasters
BBC sports presenters and reporters
Tennis people from Berkshire